The 2019–20 FIBA Europe Cup was the fifth season of the FIBA Europe Cup, a European professional basketball competition for clubs, that was launched by FIBA.

On 12 March 2020, FIBA suspended all its competitions due to the coronavirus pandemic and terminated the FIBA Europe Cup. However, Pınar Karşıyaka requested to finish the competition with a Final Four format as in the 2019–20 Basketball Champions League.

On 16 June 2020, FIBA Europe announced the season was declared void and would not be finished due to the COVID-19 pandemic.

Team allocation
Teams from around Europe can sign up to play in the FIBA Europe Cup. Spots are granted based on results in domestic championships.

Teams registered were officially published on 23 July 2019.

Applicants

The following 4 teams chose the option of ending their continental adventure if they were eliminated from the Champions League qualifying rounds and therefore refuse to participate in the FIBA Europe Cup:

  Karhu
  Lietkabelis
  Polski Cukier Toruń
  San Pablo Burgos

Round and draw dates
The schedule of the competition is as follows.

Qualifying round
The draw for the qualifying round will be held on 24 July 2019 at the FIBA headquarters in Munich, Germany.

Teams are divided into seeded and unseeded teams based on their club coefficients, and then drawn into two-legged home-and-away ties, being the second leg played at the home of the seeded team.

Seeds

Qualifying round
A total of 10 teams played in the first qualifying round. The first legs were played on 2 October, and the second legs were played on 9 October 2019.

|}

Regular season

The draw for the regular season was held on 24 July 2019 at the FIBA headquarters in Munich, Germany.

The 32 teams are drawn into eight groups of four, a maximum of two clubs from the same country can be in the same group. In each group, teams play against each other home-and-away in a round-robin format. The group winners and runners-up advance to the second round, while the third-placed teams and fourth-placed teams are eliminated.

The following 4 teams chose the option of ending their continental adventure if they were eliminated from the Champions League qualifying rounds and therefore refuse to participate in the FIBA Europe Cup:

  Karhu
  Lietkabelis
  Polski Cukier Toruń
  San Pablo Burgos

A total of 32 teams play in the regular season: the 12 teams directly qualified, the 5 winners of the  qualifying round, the 15 of 16 losers of the 2019–20 Champions League qualifying rounds.

Depending on the number of teams mentioned above that were eliminated from the Basketball Champions League qualifying rounds and with the aim to complete the 32 places in the regular season, the number of the defeated teams in the  qualifying round of the FIBA Europe Cup that advanced to the regular season were determined by the point difference recorded at the end of their pairings. In their draw, the first qualifying round was used for tie-breaking. In the draw persists, the next criterion was the performance of clubs in the last three seasons at the European competitions.

The match-days are on 22–23 October, 29–30 October, 5–6 November, 12–13 November, 19–20 November and 27 November 2019.

Group A

Group B

Group C

Group D

Group E

Group F

Group G

Group H

Second round
In each group, teams play against each other home-and-away in a round-robin format. The group winners and runners-up advance to the quarterfinals, while the third-placed teams and fourth-placed teams are eliminated.

A total of 16 teams play in the second round: the eight group winners and the eight runners-up of the regular season. The match-days will be on 11 December, 18 December 2019, 7–8 January, 20–22 January, 29 January and 4–5 February 2020.

Group I

Group J

Group K

Group L

Play-offs

Quarterfinals
The first legs were played on 4 March, and the second legs on 11 March 2020.

Semifinals
The first legs were to be played on 25 March, and the second legs on 1 April 2020.

Finals

The first leg were to be played on 22 April, and the second leg on 29 April 2020.

See also
2019–20 EuroLeague
2019–20 EuroCup Basketball
2019–20 Basketball Champions League

References

External links
Official website

 
FIBA Europe Cup
 
FIBA Europe Cup